Pillar Point may refer to:

Pillar Point (band)
Pillar Point Air Force Station
Pillar Point Harbor, California
Pillar Point (Hong Kong), a coastal area of Tuen Mun Town
Pillar Point, New York
Pillar Point County Park, Washington state